The 2009–10 Utah State Aggies men's basketball team represented Utah State University in the 2009–10 college basketball season. This was head coach Stew Morrill's 12th season at Utah State. The Aggies played their home games at the Dee Glen Smith Spectrum and are members of the Western Athletic Conference. They finished the season 27–8, 14–2 to capture the regular season championship for the third consecutive year. They advanced to the championship game of the 2010 WAC men's basketball tournament before losing to New Mexico State. They received an at–large bid to the 2010 NCAA Division I men's basketball tournament, earning a 12 seed in the South Region, where they lost to 5 seed and AP #23 Texas A&M in the first round.

Pre-season
In the WAC preseason polls, released October 20 via media teleconference, Utah State was selected to finish first in the coaches poll, receiving 8 first place votes, with Sr. guard Jared Quayle selected to the All-WAC first team and Jr. forward Tai Wesley selected to the All-WAC second team. They were also selected to finish 1st in the media poll, receiving 15 first place votes, with Jared Quayle selected to the All-WAC first team.

2009–10 Team

Roster
Source
Indicates Red Shirt Year

Coaching staff

2009–10 schedule and results
Source
All times are Mountain

|-
!colspan=9| Exhibition

|-
!colspan=9| Regular Season

|-
!colspan=9| 2010 WAC men's basketball tournament

|-
!colspan=10| 2010 NCAA Division I men's basketball tournament

Season highlights
The Aggies December 5 loss to Saint Mary's ended their 37-game home winning streak and their 65-game regular season home winning streak in non-conference games.

On December 28, Jr. Tai Wesley was named the WAC player of the week for the seventh week of the season with weekly averages of 16.7 PPG, 7.7 RPG, 4.0 AST, 1.7 blocks and 65.4 FG%.

On January 18, Sr. Jared Quayle was named the WAC player of the week for the tenth week of the season with weekly averages of 14.0 PPG, 5.3 RPG, 5.7 AST and 55.2 FG%.

With their win over Idaho on January 23, head coach Stew Morrill recorded his 500th career victory.

With their win over Hawai'i on February 25 the Aggies joined Gonzaga and Kansas as the only schools in the country to have 23 wins or more every season since 2000.

On March 7, Jr. Tai Wesley was named the WAC player of the week for the seventeenth week of the season with weekly averages of 22.5 PPG, 6.5 RPG, 5.5 AST and 82.6 FG%.

References

Utah State
Utah State Aggies men's basketball seasons
Utah State
Aggies
Aggies